Knut Holte (born 25 May 1967) is a retired Norwegian football defender.

He played for Hamarkameratene from 1986 to 1990. Then, from 1991 to 1993, he played 48 Norwegian Premier League games and scored 4 goals for SFK Lyn. In 1994 and 1995 he played 35 league games and scored 5 goals for Stabæk Fotball. He was in the squad for the 1996 season, but had an unsuccessful achilles operation in pre-season. He had to retire.

References

1967 births
Living people
Norwegian footballers
Hamarkameratene players
Lyn Fotball players
Stabæk Fotball players

Association football defenders